The Ministry of National Guidance and Religious Affairs is a ministry in Zambia. It is headed by the Minister of National Guidance and Religious Affairs.

The ministry was originally created as the Ministry for National Guidance. It was renamed the Ministry for Development and National Guidance after the Development portfolio was merged into it in 1970.

During the multi-party era, the ministry was initially created in 1997 a desk in the Office of the President, overseen by a deputy minister. It became a full ministry in 2016.

List of ministers

Deputy ministers

References

National Guidance and Religious Affairs
 
Zambia
Religion in Zambia